Tachlifa of the West (translit: Tachlifa bar Ma'arava, lit. "Tachlifa son of the West"), was an amora from Syria Palæstina who studied under Rabbi Abbahu. He often travelled to Babylonia.

References

Talmud rabbis of the Land of Israel